Constituencies are used to elect representatives ('deputies') to Luxembourg's unicameral national legislature, the Chamber of Deputies.

Electoral law in Luxembourg is dictated by Articles 51, 52, and 53 of the Constitution. The number of deputies is set at sixty, and boundaries of the constituencies are based on administrative cantonal boundaries. As a result, the constituencies have greatly differing populations, so each elects a different number of deputies, dependent upon the share of the national population.

Suffrage is universal and compulsory amongst adult resident citizens not otherwise disqualified. Luxembourg's electoral system is a form of the Hagenbach-Bischoff system (a variant of the D'Hondt method), which allocates seats to party lists by proportion of the votes won in each constituency. Under Luxembourg's system, each citizen may vote for as many candidates as there are deputies elected from that constituency. As a result, the national popular vote has no significance, as it reflects only the number of votes cast, and not the number of voters or the number of deputies elected.

There are four constituencies in Luxembourg:

 Centre includes the cantons of Luxembourg and Mersch, both of which are in the former Luxembourg District. , Centre has an estimated population of 151,166 and elects 21 deputies.
 East is coterminous with the former Grevenmacher District, and includes the cantons of Echternach, Grevenmacher and Remich. , East has an estimated population of 53,842 and elects 7 deputies.
 North is coterminous with the former Diekirch District, and includes the cantons of Clervaux, Diekirch, Redange, Vianden, and Wiltz. , North has an estimated population of 70,826 and elects 9 deputies.
 South includes the cantons of Capellen and Esch-sur-Alzette, both of which are in the former Luxembourg District. , South has an estimated population of 184,256 and elects 23 deputies.

References

 
Luxembourg
Luxembourg politics-related lists